Yogesh Gauchan is a Nepalese politician and member of Nepali Congress. He was elected in 2022 to the House Of Representatives from Mustang, Nepal.

He is the son of Romy Gauchan Thakali.

References

Living people
Nepali Congress politicians from Gandaki Province
People from Mustang District
Nepal MPs 2022–present
1993 births